Piano–Rag–Music is a ballet made by Todd Bolender to Stravinsky's eponymous music from 1919. The premiere took place on June 23, 1972, as part of New York City Ballet's Stravinsky Festival at the New York State Theater, Lincoln Center.

Original cast 

Gloria Govrin  
John Clifford

External links 
NY Times review by Clive Barnes, June 24, 1972
NY Times review by Clive Barnes, February 4, 1973

New York City Ballet repertory
New York City Ballet Stravinsky Festival
Ballets by Todd Bolender
1972 ballet premieres
Ballets to the music of Igor Stravinsky